Barwick–LaFayette Airport  is a city-owned, public-use airport located one nautical mile (2 km) south of the central business district of LaFayette, a city in Walker County, Georgia, United States. It is included in the National Plan of Integrated Airport Systems for 2011–2015, which categorized it as a general aviation facility.

Original construction of the airport was funded by ET Barwick Mills, a major carpet manufacturer of the 1960s and 1970s which operated facilities in and around LaFayette.

Facilities and aircraft 
Barwick–LaFayette Airport covers an area of 20 acres (8 ha) at an elevation of 777 feet (237 m) above mean sea level. It has one runway designated 2/20 with an asphalt surface measuring 5,350 by 75 feet (1,631 x 23 m).

For the 12-month period ending July 3, 2011, the airport had 6,750 aircraft operations, an average of 18 per day: 98.5% general aviation and 1.5% military. At that time there were 46 aircraft based at this airport: 87% single-engine, 11% multi-engine, and 2% ultralight.

References

External links 
 Barwick–LaFayette Airport at City of LaFayette website
 9A5 – BARWICK LAFAYETTE at Georgia DOT airport directory
 Aerial image as of January 1999 from USGS The National Map
 
 

Airports in Georgia (U.S. state)
Buildings and structures in Walker County, Georgia
Transportation in Walker County, Georgia